Narciso Horácio Doval (4 January 1944 - 12 October 1991) was an Argentine football player.

El Loco Doval was born in Buenos Aires. Playing in the hole, as a winger, or as a forward, Doval was skillful, had a good technical ability, and could both score and create a lot of opportunities for a centre forward. His style of playing quickly made him an idol in every club he played for, but especially in Rio de Janeiro rivals Flamengo and Fluminense. He scored 95 goals in 263 matches for Flamengo, and 68 goals in 142 matches for Fluminense.  Zico said that he was one of the best attacking partners he ever had. Doval also participated in Garrincha's farewell match at the Maracanã Stadium in 1973. In 1980, he played a single season with the Cleveland Cobras and New York United in the American Soccer League. He was traded from Cleveland in mid-season for American-born star Joey Fink.

In 1991, after winning a Supercopa Libertadores match against Estudiantes de la Plata, Flamengo's players met Doval and they went together to a night club in Buenos Aires. During the celebration he suffered a fatal heart attack at the age of 47.

Honours
Flamengo
Rio State Championship: 1972, 1974
Taça Guanabara: 1972, 1973

Fluminense
Rio State Championship: 1976

Achievements
Rio State Championship's top scorer: 1972, 1976

References

External links
  
 
 Narciso Horacio Doval American Soccer League Players

1944 births
1991 deaths
Footballers from Buenos Aires
American Soccer League (1933–1983) players
Argentine footballers
San Lorenzo de Almagro footballers
CR Flamengo footballers
Club Atlético Huracán footballers
New York Apollo players
Fluminense FC players
Expatriate footballers in Brazil
Argentine expatriate sportspeople in Brazil
Argentine expatriate sportspeople in the United States
Association football forwards 
Association football midfielders